A sarcophagus is a funeral receptacle for a corpse.

Sarcophagus may also refer to:

 "Sarcophagus" (The Outer Limits), a television episode
 Chernobyl Nuclear Power Plant sarcophagus, a concrete structure erected after the Chernobyl disaster
 Sarcophagus Point, a headland in the South Sandwich Islands
 Sarcophagus Pond, Antarctica

See also

 Sarcophagidae, a family of flies commonly known as flesh flies
 Sarcophaga, a genus known as common flesh flies
 Sarcofagus, a Finnish heavy metal band